Perera is a common surname found in Sri Lanka and the Iberian Peninsula. The name was introduced in Sri Lanka by the Portuguese during the period of Portuguese Ceylon, and it derives from the common Portuguese surname Pereira (meaning pear tree). There are other variants in the Iberian Peninsula: Perer (Catalan), Perero, Pereros (Extremadura, Salamanca and Valladolid), Pereyra, Pereyras, Das Pereiras, Paraira (Portuguese), Pereire, Pereyre (Pyrenees), Pereiro, Pereiros (Galician).

General
Augurio Perera, Spanish pioneer of lawn tennis and a founder of the world's first tennis club
Ajith C. S. Perera, Sri Lankan academic, manager and cricket umpire
Anura C. Perera, Sri Lankan American Sinhala science writer and astronomer
Andiris Perera Dharmagunawardhana, Sri Lankan businessman, philanthropist and pioneer of the Buddhist revival movement
Cheryl Perera (born 1986), Sri Lankan Canadian children's rights activist
Elmo Noel Joseph Perera (1932-2015), 5th Bishop of the Roman Catholic Diocese of Galle
Frederica Perera (born 1941), American environmental health scientist 
Izidor Perera-Matić, Croatian physician and partisan during World War II
Lionello Perera, Italian-American banker and philanthropist
Nadeeka Perera, Sri Lankan model
Sylvia Brinton Perera, Jungian psychoanalyst and author

Arts
Algama Koralalage Lionel Kumaradasa Perera (1935-2008), Sri Lankan Sinhala musician and composer
Camillus Perera, Sri Lankan cartoonist
Chandralekha Perera, Sri Lankan Sinhala pop vocalist
H. A. Perera, Sri Lankan actor
J. A. Milton Perera, Sri Lankan singer
Ladislaus Perera Ranasinghe (1913-1983), Sri Lankan Sinhala actor
Lahiru Perera, Sri Lankan Sinhala musician, music producer
Mahendra Perera, Sri Lankan Sinhala actor
Mary Felicia Perera (born 1944), Sri Lankan Sinhala cinema actress
Mirihana Arachchige Nanda Perera, Sri Lankan singer
Nalin Perera (born 1969), Sri Lankan Sinhala singer-songwriter
Ranasinghe Arachchige Chandrasena Perera, Sri Lankan musician
Shirley Perera, Sri Lankan radio personality
Wannakulawattawaduge Don Albert Perera, Sri Lankan singer
Dennis Perera, Sri Lankan film director
Rukshan Perera, Sri Lankan Sinhala singer-songwriter, multi-instrumentalist, and record producer
Sunil Perera, Sri Lankan Sinhala Baila vocalist, guitarist, songwriter and composer
Vicumpriya Perera, Sri Lankan Sinhala lyricist, poet, and music producer
Koddul Arachchige Wilson Perera (1926-2006), Sri Lankan Sinhala director

Politics, military and state officials
Alexander Perera Jayasuriya (1901-1980), Sri Lankan Sinhala MP and Cabinet Minister
Andrew Ranjan Perera, Sri Lankan judge
Christopher Allan Hector Perera Jayawardena, Sri Lankan Sinhala army officer
Cyril E. S. Perera (1892-1968), Sri Lankan Sinhala member of the Ceylon House of Representatives
Denis Perera, Sri Lankan Army officer
Dick Perera, 6th Commander of the Sri Lanka Air Force
Donald Perera, Sri Lankan Air Force officer
Edmund Walter Perera Seneviratne Jayawardena, Sri Lankan Sinhala lawyer and diplomat
Edward George Perera Jayetileke, Chief Justice of Sri Lanka from 1950-1952
E. W. Perera, Sri Lankan politician
Edwin Aloysius Perera Wijeyeratne, Sri Lankan politician and diplomat
Ernest Perera (1932-2013), Inspector-General of Sri Lanka Police from 1988-1993
Felix Perera, Sri Lankan politician
Felix Stanley Christopher Perera Kalpage (died 2000), Permanent Representative of Sri Lanka to the United Nations from 1991-1994 
Henry Perera, 8th Commander of the Sri Lanka Navy
Janaka Perera, Sri Lankan General and politician
Jayantha Perera, 19th Commander of the Sri Lanka Navy
Joseph Michael Perera, 24th Minister of Home Affairs of Sri Lanka
Jude Perera, member for Cranbourne District of Victorian Legislative Assembly, Australia
M. J. Perera, Sri Lankan high-civil servant
Monath Perera, Sri Lankan Sinhala Air Force fighter pilot
Neomal Perera, Sri Lankan politician
Noemí Santana Perera, a member of the Podemos party of Spain
N. M. Perera, Sri Lankan politician
Reginald Perera (1915-1977), Sri Lankan Sinhala Trotskyist
Roberto Smith Perera, Venezuelan politician
Rohini Perera Marasinghe, Puisne Justice of the Supreme Court of Sri Lanka
Selina Perera (1909-1986), Sri Lankan Sinhala Trotskyist
Don Stanley Ernest Perera Rajapakse Senanayake , Inspector-General of Sri Lanka Police from 1970-1978
Sumedha Perera, Sri Lankan Sinhala army major general
Theodore Duncan Perera, Sri Lankan Sinhala civil servant
Victor Perera, Governor of Northern Province, Sri Lanka from July 2008 – October 2008

Sports
Amila Perera, Sri Lankan cricketer
Augurio Perera, Anglo-Spanish tennis player
Bathiya Perera, Sri Lankan cricketer
Chandrishan Perera (1961-2021), Sri Lankan Sinhala rugby union player, coach, commentator, journalist, lawyer and administrator 
Derek Perera, Sri Lankan Canadian cricketer
Dilruwan Perera, Sri Lankan cricketer
Domènec Balmanya Perera, Spanish footballer
Duminda Perera, Sri Lankan cricketer
Franck Perera, French race car driver
Gamini Perera, Sri Lankan cricketer
Hasini Perera (born 1995), Sri Lankan Sinhala cricketer
João Manuel Perera Junqueira, Portuguese runner
José Jesús Perera, Spanish footballer
Kalana Perera, Sri Lankan Cricketer
Kusal Perera, Sri Lankan Cricketer
Mahesh Perera, Sri Lankan Sinhala Olympic hurdler
Nimesh Perera, Sri Lankan cricketer
Peter Perera, Sri Lankan cricketer
Ruchira Perera, Sri Lankan cricketer
S. Perera (Old Cambrians cricketer), Sri Lankan cricketer
Suresh Perera, Sri Lankan cricketer
Thisara Perera, Sri Lankan cricketer
Viraj Perera, Sri Lankan cricketer
Wimalasena Perera (born 1945), Sri Lankan Sinhala long-distance runner

Sinhalese surnames
Surnames of Sri Lankan origin